Smethcott (sometimes Smethcote) is a civil parish and dispersed hamlet near the village of Picklescott, in Shropshire, England. The population of the civil parish at the 2011 census was 254.

The name Smethcott has an Old English origin, and means "cottage(s) of the smiths". It was listed as a manor in Domesday, where (spelt "Smerecote") it is recorded as having been held by Eldred, the tenant of its former owner Edmund, who now himself held it from a member of the Anglo-Norman nobility. A 13th century motte-and-bailey castle existed at Smethcott, of which now only the earthworks remain in a field near the church.

The church, which is dedicated to St Michael and All Angels, was largely rebuilt in 1850 though retains some Norman features. The parish's war memorial, a stone cross, is in the churchyard and there is also a Roll of Honour inside the church.

The village school closed in 1964 and today the nearest services (pubs, shops, etc.) are found in Picklescott and Leebotwood.

The rural parish is situated in the northern foothills of the Long Mynd and includes Picklescott and the hamlet of Betchcott. The nearest town is Church Stretton. To the south is the village and parish of Woolstaston, with the Betchcott Brook forming the parish boundary.

See also
Listed buildings in Smethcott

References

Civil parishes in Shropshire
Villages in Shropshire
Shrewsbury and Atcham